Forbidden Planet Explored is a double album by Jack Dangers. The first CD is a live performance of the soundtrack to Forbidden Planet while the second CD is sci-fi sound effects.

Liner notes
"Music feed recorded live at the I.D.E.A.L Festival, Le Lieu Unique in Nantes, France on March 6, 2004 during the screening of the film Forbidden Planet. Forbidden Planet Explored contains a second CD full of sci-fi sound effects inspired by the BBC Radiophonic Workshop (a highly innovative collaborative workshop responsible for early groundbreaking electronic music which were used as the soundtrack for numerous BBC programs starting in the sixties) and vintage sci-fi films such as Forbidden Planet. Sci Fi Sound Effects was created on his room-sized EMS Synthi 100. Jack's Synthi 100 is one of only 29 ever built and one of the few Synthi's known to be operational. From the Synthi 100 this maestro of sound is able to produce elaborate unheard tones, drones, bleeps and blobs. This CD is only available as an accompaniment to Forbidden Planet Explored."

Track listing

CD 1
Note: doubled quote characters are present where a set of quotation marks are included as part of the title.
"Main Titles - Overture" - 1:26
"Deceleration" - 0:45
"Once Around Altair" - 1:25
"The Landing" - 1:32
"Flurry of Dust - A Robot Approaches" - 1:05
"A Shangri-La in the Desert Garden with Cuddly Tiger" - 1:02
"Graveyard - A Night with Two Moons" - 1:09
""Robby, Make Me A Gown"" - 1:09
"An Invisible Monster Approaches" - 1:23
"Robby Arranges Flowers, Zaps Monkey" - 0:47
"Love At The Swimming Hole" - 4:14
"Morbius' Study" - 3:02
"Ancient Krell Music" - 1:03
"The Mind Booster - Creation of Matter" - 0:37
"Krell Shuttle Ride and Power Station" - 3:16
"Robby, the Cook, and 60 Gallons of Booze" - 1:22
"Giant Footprints In The Sand" - 0:52
""Nothing Like This Claw Found In Nature!"" - 1:13
"Battle With Invisible Monster" - 2:12
""Come Back To Earth With Me"" - 2:43
"The Monster Pursues - Morbius Is Overcome" - 5:58
"The Homecoming" - 1:31
"Overture Reprise - 2" - 0:47

CD 2
"Sounds From Venus" - 0:31
"Martian Landscape #1" - 1:05
"Saucer Interior" - 0:32
"Gasseus Beings" - 0:56
"Dream Controller" - 1:20
"Plates Of Sand" - 0:49
"Greetings From Phobos" - 0:33
"Planetary Traffic" - 1:15
"Universal Time Signal" - 0:38
"Sooth Siren" - 1:27
"Saturn Surfer" - 1:35
"UFO #1" - 0:54
"Meteor Ride" - 0:37
"Animation Suspended" - 0:35
"Last Transmission" - 0:36
"Ship Alarm" - 0:45
"Moon Surface Transporter" - 1:27
"Transporter Alarm" - 0:24
"Gravity Backpack" - 0:31
"Space Bike" - 0:57
"Eye Android...Approaching" - 0:21
"Obedience Gun" - 0:29
"Contact" - 0:31
"Shimmering Particles" - 0:57
"Docking Procedure" - 0:55
"Sexularis" - 1:02
"Bleak Landscape #1" - 0:54
"Space Wars" - 0:58
"Are We In Space?" - 1:11
"Cold Sun" - 1:21
"Planet Of Rain" - 0:38
"Planet Of Life" - 0:51
"Particle Storm" - 1:09
"Venutian Ghosts" - 2:12
"Ice Wave" - 1:17
"UFO #2" - 0:43
"Hubble Deep Field #1" - 1:35
"Test Charge" - 0:34
"Alien Dashboard" - 1:11
"Bleak Landscape #2" - 1:27
"Sounds From Planet X" - 1:26
"Deep Glissando #1" - 1:31
"UFO #3" - 0:39
"Deep Glissando #2" - 1:34
"Saucer Laboratory" - 1:27
"Alien Signals" - 1:04
"Bleak Landscape #3" - 0:59
"Slow Drift" - 1:33
"Hubble Deep Field #2" - 1:27
"Signals From Earth..." - 1:19

References

External links
Discogs entry

Jack Dangers albums
2004 live albums
Science fiction soundtracks
Covers albums